The 1828 United States presidential election in Maine took place between October 31 and December 2, 1828, as part of the 1828 United States presidential election. Voters chose nine representatives, or electors to the Electoral College, who voted for the president and vice president.

Maine voted for the National Republican candidate, John Quincy Adams, over the Democratic candidate, Andrew Jackson. Adams won Maine by a margin of 19.68%. Adams received eight electoral votes and Jackson received one.

With 59.71% of the popular vote, Maine would prove to be Adams' fifth strongest state in the 1828 election after Rhode Island, Massachusetts, Vermont and Connecticut.

This was the only time prior to the 2016 election (when Republican nominee Donald Trump received one of the state's four votes) that an electoral vote split occurred in Maine.

Results

See also
 United States presidential elections in Maine

References

Maine
1828
1828 Maine elections